Małgorzata Pępek (born 1961) is a Polish politician, in 2002–2011 the head of Gmina Ślemień. Elected to the Sejm in 2011, 2015, 2019.

References

1961 births
Living people
Members of the Polish Sejm 2011–2015
Members of the Polish Sejm 2015–2019
Members of the Polish Sejm 2019–2023